The 1903 season in Swedish football, starting January 1903 and ending December 1903:

Honours

Official titles

Competitions

Promotions, relegations and qualifications

Promotions

Relegations

Domestic results

Svenska Bollspelsförbundets serie klass 1 1903 

Title-deciding match

Svenska Bollspelsförbundets serie klass 2 1903

Svenska Mästerskapet 1903 
Final

Kamratmästerskapen 1903 
Final

Svenska Fotbollpokalen 1903 I 

Final

Svenska Fotbollpokalen 1903 II 

Final

Notes

References 
Print

Online

 
Seasons in Swedish football